Magnús Brynjólfsson (5 June 1923 – 6 December 1976) was an Icelandic alpine skier. He competed in two events at the 1948 Winter Olympics.

References

1923 births
1976 deaths
Magnús Brynjólfsson
Magnús Brynjólfsson
Alpine skiers at the 1948 Winter Olympics
Magnús Brynjólfsson
20th-century Icelandic people